A Law Enforcement Purple Heart is a generic term to describe an American law enforcement medal which may be issued to any law enforcement officer who is injured, wounded or killed in the line of duty. The term is based on the Purple Heart Medal issued by the United States Armed Forces. One of the major pushing organizations for the Purple Heart for Law Enforcement is the National Associations of Chiefs of Police who award the Law Enforcement Purple Heart.

As the Police Purple Heart is issued by several different local police agencies, exact criteria for issuance vary.

Iowa
In the year 2013 after several incidents, the Iowa State Police Association (ISPA) proposed the idea of the Iowa Law Enforcement Purple Heart Medal. In July 2013 the ISPA unanimously voted for the adoption of the award. The award was for those sworn Iowa law enforcement officers who have been seriously wounded or killed in the line of duty as a result of a combat incident. Their criteria were for those seriously, critically or fatally injured in the performance of law enforcement duty. They also stated that this award may be awarded for an injury that was averted by the wearing of body armor.

Texas
The State of Texas has the Star of Texas Award. This award is given to peace officers, firefighters, and emergency first responders who are killed or suffer serious injury in the line of duty. It is also given to the family members of those mentioned. This award is given every September in a ceremony.

References

Awards and decorations of United States law enforcement agencies